Roy Truett Latimer (born August 23, 1928) is an American politician. He served as a Democratic member in the Texas House of Representatives from 1953 to 1963. Latimer also served as the president of the Houston Museum of Natural Science.

References

1928 births
Living people
Democratic Party members of the Texas House of Representatives